The Somerset & Dorset Railway Heritage Trust (S&DRHT) is a heritage railway line in Somerset, England, that runs on a restored section of the Somerset and Dorset Joint Railway. The line is approximately 1 mile long and operates from Midsomer Norton South.

History

British Railways ownership 
The Evercreech to Bath section of the S&D, the section which Midsomer Norton South was a part of, opened on July 20 1874. It was a final attempt by the S&D to achieve profitability by connecting to Bath and crossing the Somerset Coalfield. This failed however, and the railway became jointly owned by the Midland Railway (MR) and the London and South Western Railway (LSWR). At the 1923 Grouping, the line became jointly owned by the London, Midland and Scottish Railway and the Southern Railway, as successors to the MR and LSWR respectively.

After nationalisation in 1948 the line became part of the Southern Region, the era that the trust aims to preserve after. Following the Breeching Report in 1963 it was announced that the line would close and did so on March 6 1966.

Heritage railway 
The S&D Heritage Trust was formed some 30 years after the closure of the S&DJR in 1966 under the Beeching Axe, headquartered in Midsomer Norton. The station site was sold in 1969 to a local school, and then in 1995 to the Wansdyke district council, who leased it to the Trust to restore to its 1950s condition.

The Trust has since restored the original station buildings, a signalbox and a goods shed. A museum is located in an old horse stable block that houses a collection of S&DJR memorabilia, and there is also a pillbox with World War II exhibits. Having agreed a lease arrangement with the trackbed owners, the Trust has over time relaid the track which now runs for 1 mile from the station up the ruling 1:50 gradient to the infilled cutting towards . The railway bridge over Silver St has been removed, and further extension Southwards will require removal of the in-fill and restoration of the former Chilcompton railway tunnel. 

Commercial activities such as catering, retail services and the operation of public trains over the original trackbed come under the control of the Somerset & Dorset Joint Railway Company Ltd., a wholly owned subsidiary of the Trust. It is separate to and should not be confused with the Somerset and Dorset Railway Trust, which is located at the West Somerset Railway's Washford railway station.

The Trust eventually raised only £80,000 by the deadline, and the site was sold to another party.

Operations
The line has a variety of rolling stock that can be used to provide an arrange of events and running days for the public. On a typical running day, the railway runs a three coach train with steam at one end and diesel at the other. Some events that the railway has done over the past few years include:

 Visits from local schools or private events such as societies or tourists.
 Santa and Easter specials.
 Pines Express remembered gala, this typically takes place in September to mark the anniversary of the last Pines Express.

Rolling stock

Steam Locomotives

Diesel Locomotives

Diesel Multiple units

Previous visitors

Coaching stock 
British Rail Mark 1 coaches were the principal passenger stock of the Somerset and Dorset Joint Railway from 1951 until the closure of the railway on 6 March 1966. The railway currently has five of these vehicles, four of which is in service.

Wagon stock

Other stock

Former rolling and coach stock

See also
Somerset and Dorset Railway Trust
New Somerset and Dorset Railway

References

External links

Heritage railways in Somerset
Railway museums in England
Museums in Somerset
Somerset and Dorset Joint Railway